"Mobile" is a song by Canadian singer-songwriter Avril Lavigne from her debut studio album, Let Go (2002). The song was written by Lavigne and Clif Magness, with production being helmed solely by Magness. In May 2003, the song was released in New Zealand and Australia as the fifth single from the album.

Composition
According to the sheet music published at Musicnotes.com by Alfred Publishing, the song is written in the key of A major and is set in time signature of common time with a tempo of 100 beats per minute.

Critical reception
Pat Blashill of Rolling Stone referred to "Mobile" as a "completely inescapable hit". He noted that "Lavigne wails over crashing waves of acoustic and electric guitars, her big voice occasionally turns sideways in a drawl, a casual hint that she may actually be, of all things, a fine country singer in the making".

Chart performance
"Mobile" was solely released as a single in New Zealand and Australia. The song debuted at number 36 on the New Zealand Singles Chart for the issue dated May 11, 2003. It spent a total of 11 weeks on the chart, peaking at number 26 for the issue dated June 8, 2003.

Music video
A music video was filmed for the song in December 2002, although it was shelved for unknown reasons. In January 2011, the music video leaked online.

Credits and personnel
Credits and personnel adapted from the Let Go album liner notes.
Avril Lavigne – writer, lead vocals
Clif Magness – writer, producer, recording, guitars, bass, keyboards, programming
Steve Gryphon – drum recording
Tom Hardisty – drum recording assistant
Tom Lord-Alge – mixing at South Beach Studios (Miami)
Femio Hernandez – mixing assistant
Josh Freese – drums

Charts

References

2003 singles
Avril Lavigne songs
2002 songs
RCA Records singles
Songs written by Avril Lavigne
Songs written by Clif Magness
Arista Records singles